Mary Kathleen Turner (born June 19, 1954) is an American actress. She has received various accolades, including two Golden Globe Awards, in addition to nominations for an Academy Award, a Grammy Award, and two Tony Awards.

Turner became widely known during the 1980s, with roles in Body Heat (1981), The Man with Two Brains (1983), Crimes of Passion (1984), Romancing the Stone (1984), and Prizzi's Honor (1985), the latter two earning her a Golden Globe Award for Best Actress – Motion Picture Musical or Comedy, and Peggy Sue Got Married (1986), for which she was nominated for the Academy Award for Best Actress. In the later 1980s and early 1990s, Turner had roles in The Accidental Tourist (1988), The War of the Roses (1989), and Serial Mom (1994).

She later had roles in The Virgin Suicides (1999), Baby Geniuses (1999), Beautiful (2000), and Marley & Me (2008). On TV she guest-starred on the NBC sitcom Friends as Chandler Bing's drag queen father Charles Bing, in the third season of Showtime's Californication as Sue Collini, the jaded, sex-crazed owner of a talent agency, and on the Netflix dramedy series The Kominsky Method as Michael Douglas's character's ex-wife Roz Volander. Turner's voice roles include Jessica Rabbit in Who Framed Roger Rabbit (1988), Monster House (2006), and voicing characters on the television series The Simpsons, Family Guy, King of the Hill, and Rick and Morty.

In addition to film, Turner has worked in the theater, and has been nominated for the Tony Award twice for her Broadway roles as Maggie in Cat on a Hot Tin Roof and as Martha in Who's Afraid of Virginia Woolf? Turner has also taught acting classes at New York University.

Early life
Born June 19, 1954, in Springfield, Missouri, to Patsy (née Magee) and Allen Richard Turner, a U.S. Foreign Service officer who grew up in China (where Turner's great-grandfather had been a Methodist missionary), Turner is the third of four children, and the only one to be born in the United States. She has a sister, Susan, and two brothers.

Raised in a strictly conservative Christian home, Turner's interest in performing was discouraged by both of her parents: "My father was of missionary stock", she later explained, "so theater and acting were just one step up from being a streetwalker, you know? So when I was performing in school, he would drive my mom [there] and sit in the car. She'd come out at intermissions and tell him, 'She's doing very well.'"

Owing to her father's position with the Foreign Service, Turner grew up in Canada, Cuba, Venezuela, and London, and England. She attended high school at The American School in London, graduating in 1972. "The start of real acting for me began during high school in London", she stated in her 2008 memoir. "There were seven of us who were sort of a theater mafia. We produced, directed, acted, chose the plays, got one teacher fired and another one hired." Her father died of a coronary thrombosis one week before her graduation, and the family returned to Springfield, Missouri. At the age of 19, Turner began volunteering at a local Planned Parenthood office.

She attended Southwest Missouri State University for two years, studying theater. During this period, director Herbert Blau saw her performance in The House of Blue Leaves, and invited her to spend her senior year at the University of Maryland, Baltimore County, where she received a Bachelor of Fine Arts degree in 1977. During that period, Turner acted in several productions directed by film and stage director Steve Yeager.

Career

Theatre work and Broadway debut
In 1973, Turner spent the summer with her mother in Midland, Texas. There, at Yucca Theater, Turner made history when she was cast as the first female villain in the Summer Mummers 1973 melodrama, Plodding Among the Planets.  

Several months after moving to New York City in 1977, Turner took over the female lead in Michael Zetter's play Mister T, which co-starred Jonathan Frakes and played at Soho Repertory Theatre. That production marked her off-Broadway debut. Several months later, Turner made her Broadway debut as Judith Hastings in Gemini by Albert Innaurato, staged at The Little Theatre (now known as the Helen Hayes Theater) and starring Danny Aiello. It opened May 21, 1977, during the time when she was appearing in the soap The Doctors.

Body Heat
In 1978, Turner made her television debut in the NBC daytime soap The Doctors as the second Nola Dancy Aldrich. She made her film debut in 1981 as the ruthless Matty Walker in the thriller Body Heat; the role brought her to international prominence. Empire cited the film in 1995 when it named her one of the 100 Sexiest Stars in Film History. The New York Times wrote in 2005 that, propelled by her "jaw-dropping movie debut [in] Body Heat ... she built a career on adventurousness and frank sexuality born of robust physicality". Turner ultimately became one of the top box-office draws, and most sought-after actresses of the 1980s and early 1990s.

Turner stated in 2018, "Body Heat was a blessing because I went straight to being a leading actor and I didn't have to suffer any of this predatory male behaviour like many young actresses. It doesn't frustrate me that nearly four decades after that film I'm still referred to as a sexual icon. I got over that a long time ago."

With her deep voice, Turner was often compared to a young Lauren Bacall. When the two met, Turner reportedly introduced herself by saying, "Hi, I'm the young you."

Stardom during the 1980s
After Body Heat, Turner steered away from femme fatale roles to "prevent typecasting" and "because femme fatale roles had a shelf-life". Consequently, her first project after this was the 1983 comedy The Man With Two Brains. Turner co-starred in Romancing the Stone with Michael Douglas and Danny DeVito. Film critic Pauline Kael wrote of her performance as writer Joan Wilder, "Turner knows how to use her dimples amusingly and how to dance like a woman who didn't know she could; her star performance is exhilarating." Romancing the Stone was a surprise hit: she won a Golden Globe for her role in the film, and it became one of the top-ten-grossing movies of 1984. Turner teamed with Douglas and DeVito again the following year for its sequel, The Jewel of the Nile. Pre-production for the movie was fraught with conflict, because Turner refused to commit to the "terrible" script she had been delivered. When she said no, 20th Century Fox threatened her with a US$25 million breach of contract lawsuit. Eventually Douglas, also the film's producer, agreed to undertake rewrites on the script to make it more acceptable to Turner, which led to much back-and-forth between the two as the script was retooled right up to when shooting started in Fez, Morocco.

Several months before Jewel, Turner starred in Prizzi's Honor with Jack Nicholson, winning a second Golden Globe award, and later starred in Peggy Sue Got Married, which co-starred Nicolas Cage. For Peggy Sue, she received the award for Best Actress from the U.S. National Board of Review of Motion Pictures, as well as an Academy Award nomination for Best Actress.

In 1988's toon-noir Who Framed Roger Rabbit, she was the speaking voice of cartoon femme fatale Jessica Rabbit, intoning the famous line, "I'm not bad, I'm just drawn that way." Her uncredited, sultry performance was acclaimed as "the kind of sexpot ball-breaker she was made for". (Amy Irving provided Jessica Rabbit's singing voice in the scene in which the character first appears in the movie.) That same year, Turner also appeared in Switching Channels, which was a loose remake of the 1940 hit film His Girl Friday; this, in turn, was a loose remake of the Ben Hecht-Charles MacArthur comedy The Front Page.

Turner was the subject of the 1986 song "The Kiss of Kathleen Turner" by Austrian techno-pop singer Falco. In 1989, Turner teamed with Douglas and DeVito for a third time, in The War of the Roses, but this time as Douglas's disillusioned wife, with DeVito in the role of a divorce attorney who told their shared story. The New York Times praised the trio, saying that "Mr. Douglas and Ms. Turner have never been more comfortable a team ... each of them is at his or her comic best when being as awful as both are required to be here ... [Kathleen Turner is] evilly enchanting." In that film, Turner played a former gymnast and, as in other roles, did many of her own stunts. (She broke her nose two years after, filming 1991's V.I. Warshawski.)

1990s – slowed by rheumatoid arthritis
Turner remained an A-list film star leading lady in the early 1990s, starring in V.I. Warshawski and Undercover Blues, until rheumatoid arthritis seriously restricted her activities. She also blamed her age, stating, "when I was 40, the roles started slowing down, I started getting offers to play mothers and grandmothers."

In 1992, during the filming of Serial Mom, she began experiencing "inexplicable pains and fevers."  The rheumatoid arthritis diagnosis was made about a year later. By the time she was diagnosed, she "could hardly turn her head or walk, and was told she would end up in a wheelchair". Of this period, she has said: "My body could respond only with excruciating pain whenever I tried to move at all. The joints in my hands were so swollen, I couldn't hold a pen. Some days I couldn't hold a glass to get a drink of water. I couldn't pick up my child... my feet would blow up so badly that I couldn't get them into any kind of shoes, let alone walk on them."

Turner's appearance changed after the rheumatoid arthritis diagnosis. "The press were merciless," she states in her memoir. "They snipped that I had become fat and unrecognizable because I was an angry, washed-up diva, an out-of-control has-been, when in truth the changes in my physical appearance were caused by drugs and chemotherapy and were not within my control. Still, I did not reveal what was happening to me."

As her rheumatoid arthritis progressed, alcohol consumption became a problem. "I drank consciously at first to kill the pain....Later, after I got the new medicines and the pain began to subside, I kept drinking too much... It didn't damage my work, but it damaged me personally."

Turner has admitted that the drinking made her difficult to be around. In 2005, an article in The New York Times stated: "Rumors began circulating that she was drinking too much." In her memoir, she said: "I went on letting others believe anything they wanted to about my behavior and physical changes. Many people bought the assumption that I'd turned into a heavy drinker. I couldn't publicly refute them because I believed it was worse to have people know that I had this terrible illness. They'd hire me if they thought I was a drunk, because they could understand drinking, but they wouldn't hire me if I had a mysterious, scary illness they didn't understand.  We – Jay, my agent, myself – felt it was imperative to keep my rheumatoid arthritis quiet."

Her career as a leading lady went into a steep decline and she was seen in fewer and fewer very successful films. She turned down lead roles in Ghost and The Bridges of Madison County, both of which became big hits. She appeared in the low-budget House of Cards as well as the comedy-drama Moonlight & Valentino, and had supporting roles in A Simple Wish, The Real Blonde, and Sofia Coppola's The Virgin Suicides. She also provided the voice of Malibu Stacy's creator, Stacy Lovell, in the episode "Lisa vs. Malibu Stacy" on The Simpsons.

2000s – remission
Despite drug therapy to help her condition, the disease progressed for about eight years. Then, thanks to newly available treatments, her rheumatoid arthritis went into remission. She was seen increasingly on television, including three episodes of Friends, where she appeared as Chandler Bing's father, a drag performer.

In 2006, Turner guest-starred on FX's Nip/Tuck, playing a phone sex operator in need of laryngeal surgery. She appeared in a small role in 2008's Marley & Me and also played a defense attorney on Law & Order. In 2009, she played the role of Charlie Runkle's sexually hyperactive boss in season three of the television series Californication.

Turner starred in the indie film The Perfect Family in 2011 and had supporting roles in Nurse 3D (2013) and the comedy sequel Dumb and Dumber To in 2014.

She appeared in two episodes of the Hulu series The Path (2016–17), starred in an episode of the anthology series Dolly Parton's Heartstrings (2019) and guest-starred on two episodes of the CBS comedy series Mom in 2020. On the Netflix dramedy series The Kominsky Method, Turner was a guest in season 2 (2019) and became a main cast member in season 3 (2021). The series reunited her with fellow actor Michael Douglas for the first time since The War of the Roses.

Voice acting
Turner provided the voice of Jessica Rabbit in the 1988 live action/animated film Who Framed Roger Rabbit, its three animated short film spinoffs, and in the Disneyland attraction spinoff, Roger Rabbit's Car Toon Spin. In 2006, Turner voiced the character Constance in the animated film Monster House. Later, she provided radio commercial voice-overs for Lay's potato chips. BBC Radio 4 produced four radio dramas based on the V. I. Warshawski novels by Sara Paretsky. Two of them, Killing Orders and Deadlock, released in 2007, featured Turner reprising her 1991 film role, which had been based on Paretsky's novel Deadlock; however, the final series, Bitter Medicine, released in 2009, had Sharon Gless take over the part. In 2015, she narrated the anthology drama film Emily & Tim. Turner also had voice guest roles on the animated series King of the Hill, Family Guy, 3Below: Tales of Arcadia, Rick and Morty, Summer Camp Island, and Wizards: Tales of Arcadia.

Stage career
After 1990s roles in Broadway productions of Indiscretions and Cat on a Hot Tin Roof (for which she earned a Tony Award nomination for Best Actress), Turner moved to London in 2000 to star in a stage version of The Graduate. The BBC reported that initially mediocre ticket sales for The Graduate "went through the roof when it was announced that Turner, then aged 45, would appear naked on stage". While her performance as the infamous Mrs. Robinson was popular with audiences, with sustained high box office for the duration of Turner's run, she received mixed reviews from critics. The play transferred to Broadway in 2002 to similar critical reaction.

In 2005, Turner beat a score of other contenders (including Jessica Lange, Frances McDormand, and Bette Midler) for the role of Martha in a 2005 Broadway revival of Edward Albee's Who's Afraid of Virginia Woolf? at the Longacre Theatre. Albee later explained to the New York Times that when Turner read for the part with her eventual co-star Bill Irwin, he heard "an echo of the 'revelation' that he had felt years ago when the parts were read by [Uta] Hagen and Arthur Hill." He added that Turner had "a look of voluptuousness, a woman of appetites, yes ... but a look of having suffered, as well."

Ben Brantley praised Turner at length, writing:

As Martha, Turner received her second Tony Award nomination for Best Actress in a Play, losing to Cherry Jones. The production was transferred to London's Apollo Theatre in 2006. She starred in Sandra Ryan Heyward's one-woman show, Tallulah, which she toured across the U.S.

In August 2010, Turner portrayed the role of Sister Jamison Connelly in Matthew Lombardo's drama High at Hartford TheaterWorks. The production transferred to Broadway at the Booth Theater where it opened in previews on March 25, 2011, officially on April 19, 2011, and an announced quick closing on April 24, 2011. However, in a rare move, the production was revived, still headed by Turner, to undertake a national tour which began in Boston in December 2012.

From August to October 28, 2012, Turner appeared in Red Hot Patriot: The Kick-Ass Wit of Molly Ivins, a play about the legendary liberal Texas columnist Molly Ivins, at Arena Stage in Washington, DC. In December 2014 and January 2015, Turner performed the same show at Berkeley Repertory Theatre. She appeared again at Arena Stage in the title role of Bertolt Brecht's Mother Courage, which opened in February 2014, and playing Joan Didion in the one-woman show The Year of Magical Thinking, based on Didion's memoir of the same name, in October and November 2016. In February 2019, Turner made her debut at the Metropolitan Opera in New York City in the speaking role of The Duchess of Krakentorp in Donizetti's opera La fille du régiment.

Personal life
Turner married real estate entrepreneur Jay Weiss of New York City in 1984, and they had one daughter, singer Rachel Ann Weiss, who was born on October 14, 1987. Turner and Weiss divorced in December 2007, but Turner has said, "[Jay]'s still my best friend."

By the late 1980s, Turner had acquired a reputation for being difficult, what The New York Times called "a certifiable diva". She admitted that she had developed into "not a very kind person", and actress Eileen Atkins—with whom she starred in the play Indiscretions on Broadway—referred to her as "an amazing nightmare". In 2018, she commented on her reputation, stating: "The 'difficult' thing was pure gender crap. If a man comes on set and says, 'Here's how I see this being done', people go, 'He's decisive.' If a woman does it, they say, 'Oh, fuck. There she goes.'"

Turner has defended herself against Atkins' claims, saying that Atkins harbored animosity towards her because she was having trouble memorizing her lines, which Atkins found very unprofessional. Turner later realized that the new medication for her rheumatoid arthritis she was taking was making her "fuzzy". She added that on days when the rheumatoid arthritis in her wrist was especially bad and she warned the other cast members not to touch it, Atkins would intentionally sit on it during a scene where Turner had to play dead, causing Turner extreme pain. Turner slammed Hollywood over the difference in the quality of roles offered to male actors and female actors as they age, calling the disparity a "terrible double standard".

A few weeks after leaving the production of the play The Graduate in November 2002, she was admitted into the Geisinger Marworth Treatment Center in Waverly, Pennsylvania, for the treatment of alcoholism. "I have no problem with alcohol when I'm working", she explained. "It's when I'm home alone that I can't control my drinking ... I was going toward excess. I mean, really! I think I was losing my control over it. So it pulled me back."

Activism

Turner has worked with Planned Parenthood of America since age 19, and later became a chairperson. She also serves on the board of People for the American Way, and volunteers at Amnesty International and Citymeals-on-Wheels. She was one of John Kerry's first celebrity endorsers. She has been a frequent donor to the Democratic Party. She has also worked to raise awareness of rheumatoid arthritis.

Memoirs and interviews
In the mid-2000s, Turner collaborated with Gloria Feldt on the writing of her memoirs, Send Yourself Roses: Thoughts on My Life, Love, and Leading Roles. The book was published in 2008. In the book, Turner claimed that, while they were filming Peggy Sue Got Married, her co-star Nicolas Cage had gotten drunk and stole a Chihuahua that he liked. In turn, Cage filed a lawsuit against Turner and her book publisher in the UK, who took an excerpt from the book and posted it on their website (before publication). Cage argued defamation and damage to character and won the case, resulting in retractions, legal fees, and a donation to charity. Turner later publicly apologized. During an interview on The View, Turner apologized for any distress she might have caused Cage regarding an incident that took place 20 years earlier. 

On August 7, 2018, Vulture published an in-depth interview with Turner, wherein she expressed her opinion on a wide range of issues, from Elizabeth Taylor's acting skills to what it was like meeting Donald Trump in the 1980s. Turner's frankness and certain revelations she made caused the article to be widely shared in different media outlets, which led to her name trending on Google.

Filmography

Film

Television

Theatre

Accolades

References

External links

 Kathleen Turner Official Website
 
 
 
 2006 Article on Turner on Theatre.com
 Interview and profile in The Guardian (March 18, 2000)

1954 births
20th-century American actresses
21st-century American actresses
Actresses from Missouri
Alumni of the Royal Central School of Speech and Drama
American expatriates in Canada
American expatriates in Cuba
American expatriates in the United Kingdom
American expatriates in Venezuela
American film actresses
American television actresses
American abortion-rights activists
American soap opera actresses
American stage actresses
American voice actresses
Best Musical or Comedy Actress Golden Globe (film) winners
Critics' Circle Theatre Award winners
American LGBT rights activists
Living people
Missouri Democrats
Missouri State University alumni
New York University faculty
People educated at The American School in London
People for the American Way people
People from Springfield, Missouri
People associated with Planned Parenthood
University of Maryland, Baltimore County alumni
American women memoirists
American memoirists